Ifigenia in Tauride can refer to:
 Ifigenia in Tauride (Jommelli), opera by Niccolò Jommelli, libretto by Mattia Verazi, Naples, 1771
 Ifigenia in Tauride (Traetta), opera by Tommaso Traetta, libretto by Marco Coltellini, Vienna 1767
 Ifigenia in Tauride (Majo), opera by Gian Francesco de Majo, libretto by Mattia Verazi, Mannheim, 1764
 Ifigenia in Tauride (Vinci), opera by Leonardo Vinci, libretto by Benedetto Pasqualigo, 1724

See also
 Iphigenia in Tauris, play by Euripides, basis of all these operas
 Iphigénie en Tauride, opera by Gluck
 Iphigénie en Tauride (Campra), opera by André Campra
 Iphigénie en Tauride (Piccinni), opera by Piccinni